Dale Spehr Baker (30 January 1939 – 27 March 2012) was an Australian politician, serving as South Australian Opposition Leader and Leader of the South Australian Division of the Liberal Party of Australia from 1990 to 1992.

Parliament
Baker was elected member for the south-eastern rural seat of Victoria from the 1985 state election. Liberal leader John Olsen resigned following the 1989 state election loss with Baker succeeding him as Liberal leader two months later in January 1990.

On just 23 percent, in early 1990 he recorded the lowest Newspoll leadership approval rating in South Australian history. However, his disapproval rating was also very low at just 11 percent. In itself a record, at 66 percent, an entire two-thirds of respondents were uncommitted. From late 1991, he entered a net negative rating from which he did not recover.

Baker did not lead the Liberals to an election, resigning from the leadership in 1992, to be succeeded by Dean Brown. Baker's seat of Victoria was renamed to MacKillop from the 1993 state election. After the Liberals' landslide victory that year, Baker served as a minister under both Brown and Olsen. He remained in parliament until the 1997 state election where he unexpectedly lost his seat to Liberal-turned-independent Mitch Williams, who rejoined the Liberals in 1999.

Later life
Baker had motor neurone disease (ALS) and was a supporter of voluntary euthanasia. Baker died on 27 March 2012 from motor neurone disease.

References

 

1939 births
2012 deaths
Liberal Party of Australia members of the Parliament of South Australia
Members of the South Australian House of Assembly
Leaders of the Opposition in South Australia
Recipients of the Centenary Medal
Neurological disease deaths in Australia
Deaths from motor neuron disease